Bolton Hall is a country house near Preston-under-Scar, Richmondshire, North Yorkshire, England, in Wensleydale, some 3 miles (5 km) west of Leyburn. It was built in the late 17th century and rebuilt after a fire in 1902. It is a grade II listed building, as is an 18th-century folly tower in the grounds.

It is built in three storeys of roughcast brick with ashlar dressing and a hipped slate roof. The layout is H-shaped with a central block of 5 bays and an overall frontage of 9 bays. In the 1960s the estate covered 12,000 acres, much of it moorland and woodland, and included Bolton Castle.

History
The Bolton estate belonged to the Scrope family since medieval times, based on Bolton Castle. After the death in 1630 of Emanuel Scrope, 1st Earl of Sunderland and 11th Baron Scrope of Bolton, without any legitimate children, the estate was inherited by Mary, the eldest of his three illegitimate daughters. She married Charles, Marquess of Winchester.

Bolton Hall was originally built in 1678 for the Marquess, who in 1689 was elevated to be the first Duke of Bolton by a grateful King William III for his support in the Glorious Revolution. It passed down through five succeeding Dukes of Bolton to Harry Powlett, 6th Duke of Bolton, an admiral in the Royal Navy. The sixth Duke died without a male heir in 1794 and the dukedom became extinct, the Bolton estates devolving on his brother's natural daughter Jean Browne-Powlett. She married Thomas Orde, who in 1795 assumed the additional surname of Powlett and was a Tory politician. He served as Chief Secretary for Ireland and was ennobled in 1797 as Baron Bolton.

In 1902 the hall suffered a serious fire and was afterwards rebuilt.

The estate has since passed down to Harry Algar Nigel Orde-Powlett, 8th Baron Bolton, who inherited on his father's death. 
The current Baron resides at Bolton Hall, which was originally built in 1675. His residence in 2016 was Wensley Hall, Wensley, Leyburn.
 Bolton Castle is run by his son and daughter-in-law, Thomas and Katie Orde-Powlett.

See also
 Bay Bolton, seven times champion sire horse.
 Bolton Castle
 The Mount, North Yorkshire

References

Further reading

Bolton Hall Open Gardens (photos)

External links

Bolton Estate website

Grade II listed buildings in North Yorkshire
Country houses in North Yorkshire
Wensleydale